Swampblood is the sixth studio album by American rock band Legendary Shack Shakers.

Musical style 

The music of Swampblood encompasses rockabilly, alternative country, bluegrass, blues, country, psychobilly, rock and roll, Southern Gothic and swamp rock.

Reviews 

Andrew Gilstrap of popmatters.com rated the album at 7/10, commenting, "Swampblood finds the band in something of a high-octane back-to-basics blues mode". Embo Blake of HybridMagazine noted that the band, in this album, "maintain[ed] their distinctive sound and superb musical quality".

Track listing 
"Dawn" – 0:34
"Old Spur Line" – 3:47
"Hellwater" – 2:12
"Easter Flesh" – 2:16
"Swampblood" – 3:10
"Dusk" – 0:16
"Cheat the Hangman" – 1:36
"Born Again Again" – 2:18
"The Deadenin'" – 2:48
"Down and Out" – 3:11
"Jimblyleg Man" – 2:39
"He Ain't Right" – 2:10
"Angel Lust" – 1:55
"Preachin' at Traffic" – 1:38
"When I Die" – 1:14
"Bright and Sunny South" – 1:02

Background information 
Swampblood is the third and final installment of Legendary Shack Shakers' "Tentshow Trilogy", which began with Believe in 2004, and continued with Pandelirium in 2006. The subject matter of Believe was that of a tent revival, and of Pandelirium a circus sideshow. The tent theme surrounding Swampblood is of a graveside funeral service.

Personnel 
 Col. J.D. Wilkes – vocals, mouth harps, piano, organs, tape effects
 Mark Robertson – upright bass, bass guitar, baritone guitars, bgvs
 DavidLee – guitar
 Brett Whitacre – drums
 Steve Mabee – engineer, mixing

 Guests 
 Rich Gilbert – saw on "The Deadening"
 Jordan Richter – additional engineering on "Born Again Again"
 Paulie Simmons – drums on "Born Again Again"
 Steve Latanation – shaker, backing vocals
 Ward Stout – fiddle
 Fats Kaplan – mandolin on "Born Again Again"
 Kristi Rose – backing vocals on "Born Again Again"
 Jack Irwin – piano and organ on "Born Again Again"

References 

2007 albums
Gothic country albums
Legendary Shack Shakers albums